Southern Ports Highway is a  rural highway in South Australia that connects Kingston SE with Millicent via Rendelsham, Southend, Beachport and Robe. It is a former alignment of Princes Highway, bypassed in 1933.

Major intersections

See also

 Highways in Australia
 List of highways in South Australia

References

External links
Southern Ports Highway webpage on Ozroads website

Highways in Australia
Roads in South Australia